Robinson is a census-designated place located in West Wheatfield Township, Indiana County in the state of Pennsylvania, United States. The community is located near the Westmoreland County line and the borough of Bolivar, along Pennsylvania Route 259. As of the 2010 census, the population was 614 residents.

References

External links

Census-designated places in Indiana County, Pennsylvania
Census-designated places in Pennsylvania